David A. Sprecher, (born July 2, 1981) known professionally as Yeti Beats, is an American record producer and songwriter. In May 2020, he signed an exclusive administration agreement with Warner Chappell Music following the release of Doja Cat's singles "Say So", "Juicy" and "Candy". He has been the lead producer and collaborator on Doja Cat's projects Planet Her (2021), Hot Pink (2019) and Amala (2018). Prior to primarily working with Doja Cat, he had written and produced reggae, R&B and rap albums by groups such as Rebelution, Konshens, Los Rakas, Dark Waves and Mellow Man Ace.

Production discography

Selected production discography

Albums and EPs

Singles

Notes

References 

Living people
Record producers from California
Musicians from Los Angeles
1981 births